Louis Soldan (19 March 1920 – 25 April 1971) was an Austrian actor.

Biography 
Louis Soldan was the son of the shoe manufacturer Alois Soldan. After middle school, he trained as an actor at the Drama Seminar of Dr. Beer.

Soldan appeared in various film, television and radio play productions.

From 1950 to 1951, he acted in a theater in Graz. This was followed by appearances at the Volkstheater in Vienna starting in 1951. From 1954 to 1958 he was a member of the ensemble of the Theater in der Josefstadt.

Selected filmography 

 1940: Operetta
 1942: The Second Shot
 1943: A Salzburg Comedy
 1944: Young Hearts
 1947: Der Hofrat Geiger
 1953: Franz Schubert
 1955: Sarajevo
 1956: Her Corporal
 1958: So ein Millionär hat's schwer

External links 
 
https://oe1.orf.at/hoerspiel/suche/13760
 https://www.cinema.de/stars/star/louis-soldan,1545848,ApplicationStar.html

References 

Austrian male actors
1920 births
1971 deaths